Grenzallee is a Berlin U-Bahn station located on the U7.

History
This station was opened in 1930 and built by Alfred Grenander.

A few years later, the Second World War began in 1939, which initially had no direct impact on the station. Only from 1944, the BVG shortened the operation of the line C to Bergstraße, as the tunnel south of the station, including the stations Neukölln and Grenzallee, the arms company Henschel-Flugwerke for monthly 40,000 marks [4] (purchasing power adjusted in today's currency: around 149,200 euros) was made available. However, this foreign use soon became unnecessary due to the ongoing war.

It was the end of the Line C I until 1963.

Sources 
 berliner-untergrundbahn.de

References

External links 
 Grenzallee signal box - photos
 Description of the route to Neukölln including station photos
 More photos at untergrundbahn-berlin.de
 Plan of the area around Grenzallee U-Bahn station (PDF)

U7 (Berlin U-Bahn) stations
Buildings and structures in Neukölln
Railway stations in Germany opened in 1930